Clewes is a surname. Notable people with the surname:

Howard Clewes (1912–1988), British screenwriter and novelist
Peter Clewes, Canadian architect

See also
Clews (disambiguation)
Lewes (surname)